The three teams in this group played against each other on a home-and-away basis. The group winner Belgium qualified for the fifth FIFA World Cup held in Switzerland.

Table and Matches

 

 

 

 

 

Belgium qualified.

Team stats

Head coach:  Bill Gormlie (first and second match);  Doug Livingstone (third and fourth match)

Head coach:  Putte Kock

Head coach:  Aatos Lehtonen

External links
FIFA official page
RSSSF - 1954 World Cup Qualification
Allworldcup

2
Belgium at the 1954 FIFA World Cup
1952–53 in Swedish football
1953–54 in Swedish football
1953 in Finnish football